This is a list of the African nations ranked by Gross Domestic Product (GDP) at Purchasing Power Parity (PPP). Figures are given in international dollars according to the International Monetary Fund.

The GDP (PPP) of the dependent or integral territories of France, Italy, Malta, Portugal, Spain, the United Kingdom and Yemen within the African continent are not included in this list. For the purpose of the data published by the International Monetary Fund, the GDP (PPP) of Zanzibar is included as part of that of Tanzania, the GDP (PPP) of Western Sahara is included as part of that of Morocco, and the GDP (PPP) of Somaliland is included as part of that of Somalia.

GDP (PPP)

See also
 List of African countries by GDP (nominal)
 List of African countries by Human Development Index
 Economy of Africa

References

GDP
GDP
Africa